Jorge Miguel Ortega Salinas is a Paraguayan footballer who currently plays for Resistencia as a forward.

Club career
In February 2016 he signed for Brazilian Serie A club Coritiba Foot Ball Club.

References

External links

 zerozero.pt

1991 births
Living people
Paraguayan footballers
Paraguay under-20 international footballers
Paraguayan expatriate footballers
Association football midfielders
Paraguayan Primera División players
Chilean Primera División players
Categoría Primera A players
Argentine Primera División players
Campeonato Brasileiro Série A players
Ecuadorian Serie A players
Club Tacuary footballers
Club Rubio Ñu footballers
Cerro Porteño players
Sportivo Luqueño players
C.D. Huachipato footballers
Atlético Junior footballers
Coritiba Foot Ball Club players
Club Olimpia footballers
Club Atlético Colón footballers
C.S.D. Macará footballers
Resistencia S.C. footballers
Paraguayan expatriate sportspeople in Italy
Paraguayan expatriate sportspeople in Chile
Paraguayan expatriate sportspeople in Brazil
Paraguayan expatriate sportspeople in Colombia
Paraguayan expatriate sportspeople in Argentina
Paraguayan expatriate sportspeople in Ecuador
Expatriate footballers in Italy
Expatriate footballers in Chile
Expatriate footballers in Brazil
Expatriate footballers in Colombia
Expatriate footballers in Argentina
Expatriate footballers in Ecuador